Fu Yabing Masalon Dulo (8 August 1914 – 26 January 2021), commonly referred to as Fu Yabing, was a Filipino textile master weaver and dyer, credited with preserving the Blaan traditional mabal tabih art of ikat weaving and dyeing. At the time of her death, she was one of only two surviving master designers of the mabal tabih art of the indigenous Blaan people of southern Mindanao in the Philippines.

She was given the National Living Treasures Award by the Philippines through the National Commission for Culture and the Arts.

Biography 
Fu Yabing was born on 8 August 1914, in modern-day Polomolok, South Cotabato. She resided on Mount Matutum. Fu Yabing began weaving at age 14. Two of her tabih are considered masterpieces. One of these is displayed in the Philippine National Museum.

To preserve the Blaan weaving tradition, Fu Yabing taught the craft of tabih to her only daughter Lamina Dulo Gulili and women in her community. She was also given the honorific "Fu," as a Blaan elder.

She retired from weaving in 2018 after a motorcycle accident.

Fu Yabing died in her sleep on 26 January 2021 at the age of 106.

References 

1914 births
2021 deaths
Filipino centenarians
Filipino weavers
Indigenous peoples of the Philippines
National Living Treasures of the Philippines
People from South Cotabato
20th-century Filipino artists
21st-century Filipino artists
Women centenarians